Charles Marvin Bradshaw (March 13, 1936 – January 23, 2002) was an American football offensive tackle who played eleven seasons in the National Football League, mainly for the Pittsburgh Steelers. He served for a time as the head of the NFL Players Association.  Bradshaw earned a law degree during the offseason and after his career practiced law in Dallas, Texas until the time of his death from cancer.

As a Pittsburgh Steeler, Charlie Bradshaw became one of the most notorious linemen of the day, drawing such tremendous booing from the home crowd that club owner Art Rooney discontinued pregame introductions of players at Pitt Stadium.

External links
NFL.com player page

References

 http://sportsillustrated.cnn.com/vault/article/magazine/MAG1079427/index.htm

1936 births
2002 deaths
People from Center, Texas
American football offensive tackles
Baylor Bears football players
Los Angeles Rams players
Pittsburgh Steelers players
Detroit Lions players
Eastern Conference Pro Bowl players
Texas lawyers
Deaths from cancer in Texas
20th-century American lawyers